Mark Meyers (born December 5, 1953) is an American former professional tennis player.

Meyers grew up in Louisiana, graduating from Franklin High School in New Orleans. He was a collegiate tennis player for Duke University and won the 1973 ACC singles championship. In the late 1970s he competed briefly in professional tennis, with main draw appearances at the Australian Open and US Open. He studied at LSU Law School and worked for many years as an attorney for Shell, while continuing to compete at a high level in senior tennis tournaments.

References

External links
 
 

1953 births
Living people
American male tennis players
Tennis people from Louisiana
Duke Blue Devils men's tennis players
Louisiana State University Law Center alumni